TLPA is an acronym. It may indicate:
 Taiwanese Language Phonetic Alphabet
 The Taxicab, Limousine & Paratransit Association, a non-profit trade association of and for the private passenger transportation industry